Kępa Radwankowska  is the part of Radwanków Szlachecki village, Gmina Sobienie-Jeziory. The population is near 100. From 1975 to 1998 this place was in Siedlce Voivodeship. It lies near the Vistula river.

Villages in Otwock County